Eugenio Pazzaglia (29 December 1948 – 4 November 2021) was an Italian professional footballer who played as a forward for Fano, Pisa, Civitavecchia, Cortona and Siena.

References

1948 births
2021 deaths
Italian footballers
Association football forwards
Alma Juventus Fano 1906 players
Pisa S.C. players
A.S.D. Civitavecchia 1920 players
A.C.N. Siena 1904 players
Serie B players
Serie C players
Serie D players
Sportspeople from the Province of Perugia
Footballers from Umbria